Esteban Damián Batista Hernández (born September 2, 1983) is a Uruguayan professional basketball player for Club Atlético Olimpia of the Liga Uruguaya de Básquetbol (LUB). He was the first ever Uruguayan to play in the NBA.

Professional career
Batista began his pro career in the Uruguayan League in 2001. He then moved to the second division of Spain, the Spanish LEB League in 2003.

NBA
Batista was signed as a free agent by the Atlanta Hawks on September 12, 2005. He made his NBA debut on November 2 of that year, going scoreless in 6 minutes of play time against the Golden State Warriors. In his first NBA season, Batista averaged 1.8 points per game  and 2.5 rebounds per game in 8.7 minutes per game, in 57 games played.

On September 26, 2007, Batista signed a non-guaranteed contract with the Boston Celtics. On October 16, 2007, however, Batista was waived by the team.

Europe and China
On the same day that he was released by the Celtics, he signed with the EuroLeague team Maccabi Tel Aviv.

Batista joined the Russian Super League team Triumph Lyubertsy in December 2008, but left the club shortly thereafter for personal reasons.

Batista signed a three-year contract with Alta Gestión Fuenlabrada at the summer of 2009. In January 2011, he signed with the Euroleague team Caja Laboral.

In July 2011, he signed a two-year contract with Anadolu Efes of the Turkish Basketball League. In August 2013, he signed a one-year contract with Pınar Karşıyaka also of the Turkish Basketball League.

On July 18, 2014, he signed with Panathinaikos for the 2014–15 season. On April 5, 2015, he won the Greek Cup.

In June 2015, he signed with Beikong Fly Dragons of the Chinese Basketball Association. On February 6, 2016, after the end of the Chinese season, he signed a deal with Emporio Armani Milano until June 2017. However, at the end of the 2015–16 season, he parted ways with Milano.

In July 2016, Batista re-signed with Beikong Fly Dragons for the 2016–17 CBA season. On February 19, 2017, he signed with Italian club Reyer Venezia Mestre for the rest of the 2016–17 Serie A season.

Return to Uruguay
In August 2017, Batista returned to Uruguay and signed with Club Atlético Welcome.

Career statistics

NBA

Regular season

|-
| style="text-align:left;"|
| style="text-align:left;"|Atlanta
| 57 || 3 || 8.7 || .425 || .000 || .623 || 2.5 || .1 || .3 || .2 || 1.8
|-
| style="text-align:left;"|
| style="text-align:left;"|Atlanta
| 13 || 0 || 6.2 || .500 || .000 || .571 || 2.3 || .3 || .2 || .0 || 1.5
|- class="sortbottom"
| style="text-align:center;" colspan="2"|Career
| 70 || 3 || 8.2 || .438 || .000 || .617 || 2.5 || .2 || .3 || .2 || 1.7

EuroLeague

|-
| style="text-align:left;"|2007–08
| style="text-align:left;"|Maccabi Tel Aviv
| 24 || 5 || 17.8 || .573 || .1000 || .638 || 5.3 || .9 || 1.1 || .3 || 10.3 || 11.8
|-
| style="text-align:left;"|2008–09
| style="text-align:left;"|Maccabi Tel Aviv
| 5 || 0 || 9.0 || .500 || .000 || .800 || 2.6 || .2 || .0 || .2 || 3.6 || 4.2
|-
| style="text-align:left;"|2010–11
| style="text-align:left;"|Caja Laboral
| 10 || 3 || 19.7 || .533 || .000 || .714 || 6.3 || 1.4 || .5 || .3 || 8.4 || 9.8
|-
| style="text-align:left;"|2011–12
| style="text-align:left;"|Anadolu Efes
| 16 || 5 || 15.8 || .507 || .000 || .550 || 4.3 || .6 || .6 || .2 || 5.1 || 5.9
|-
| style="text-align:left;"|2012–13
| style="text-align:left;"|Anadolu Efes
| 4 || 0 || 11.3 || .583 || .000 || .600 || 4.3 || 1.8 || .3 || .3 || 4.3 || 3.3
|-
| style="text-align:left;"|2014–15
| style="text-align:left;"|Panathinaikos
| 26 || 25 || 21.9 || .583 || .000 || .764 || 5.5 || 1.0 || 1.0 || .3 || 10.2 || 11.8
|- class="sortbottom"
| style="text-align:center;" colspan="2"|Career
| 85 || 38 || 18 || .562 || .500 || .682 || 4.9 || .8 || .8 || .3 || 8.4 || 9.6

Domestic leagues

National team career
During his career, Batista was a member of the Uruguayan national basketball team. During the 2007 FIBA Americas Championship, which was held from August 22 through September 2, in Las Vegas, Batista averaged 20.8 points per game and 12.4 rebounds per game.

On 26 February 2023, Batista played his last game for Uruguay and retired after a 20-year career of 116 games.

References

External links

 
 ACB.com profile  
 Euroleague.net profile
 FIBA.com profile
 TBLStat.net profile

1983 births
Living people
Anadolu Efes S.K. players
Atlanta Hawks players
Baloncesto Fuenlabrada players
Basketball players at the 2003 Pan American Games
Basketball players at the 2007 Pan American Games
BC Zenit Saint Petersburg players
Beijing Royal Fighters players
Centers (basketball)
Israeli Basketball Premier League players
Karşıyaka basketball players
Libertad de Sunchales basketball players
Liga ACB players
Maccabi Tel Aviv B.C. players
Olimpia Milano players
Pan American Games bronze medalists for Uruguay
Pan American Games medalists in basketball
Panathinaikos B.C. players
Power forwards (basketball)
Reyer Venezia players
Saski Baskonia players
Sportspeople from Montevideo
National Basketball Association players from Uruguay
Undrafted National Basketball Association players
Uruguayan men's basketball players
Uruguayan expatriate basketball people in Argentina
Uruguayan expatriate basketball people in China
Uruguayan expatriate basketball people in Greece
Uruguayan expatriate basketball people in Israel
Uruguayan expatriate basketball people in Italy
Uruguayan expatriate basketball people in Russia
Uruguayan expatriate basketball people in Spain
Uruguayan expatriate basketball people in Turkey
Uruguayan expatriate basketball people in the United States
Medalists at the 2007 Pan American Games